The Second Katsura Cabinet (Japanese: 第2次桂内閣) is the 13th Cabinet of Japan led by Katsura Tarō from July 14, 1908, to August 30, 1911.

Cabinet

References 

Cabinet of Japan
1908 establishments in Japan
Cabinets established in 1908
Cabinets disestablished in 1911